Glen Richards (born 30 September 1983), is an Australian former professional motorcycle road racer and racing team manager. He raced primarily in the United Kingdom, winning the British Supersport Championship and the British Superstock championships and was a regular participant in the British Superbike Championship.

Motorcycle racing career
Richards was born in Adelaide, Australia but, who now lives in Hinckley, Leicestershire. He first came to national prominence when competing in the 1998 British Supersport championship finishing 5th overall. Richards moved up to the British Superbike Championship where he rode with the Hawk Kawasaki team from 2002 to 2005, finishing in the top 10 in the championship every year, with a best 4th-place finish is 2003 despite a lack of a full testing programme. He also contested the World Superbike round at Brands Hatch in 2002, but retired from both races. Richards switched to the Hydrex Honda team for the 2006 season, finishing in 10th place in the championship.

After that Richards dropped down to the Superstock level on an Embassy Phase One Yamaha for 2007, winning the title, leading the standings all season. He then moved up a class back to the Supersport championship for 2008 on a MAP Embassy Triumph. His first win came after a titanic scrap with Hudson Kennaugh at Oulton Park which was decided at the final corner, and he ultimately beat Kennaugh to the title. At the final round his team produced T-shirts stating that "A Triumph can even blow away a Hurricane", referring to Richards' make of bike and Kennaugh's nickname.

Richards was then signed by the HM Plant Honda team for the 2009 BSB season. His only podium finish was a second place in the opening round, however he was a regular points scorer in the first half of the season. He then suffered a broken left femur after brake failure caused a crash with Suzuki's Iain Lowry during qualifying at Knockhill.

Career statistics

British Supersport Championship
(key) (Races in bold indicate pole position, races in italics indicate fastest lap)

British Superbike Championship
(key) (Races in bold indicate pole position, races in italics indicate fastest lap)

1. – E Denotes riders participating in the Evo class within the British Superbike Championship.

References

External links
 Personal Website 

Living people
British Supersport Championship riders
British Superbike Championship riders
1973 births
Sportspeople from Adelaide
People from Hinckley
Australian motorcycle racers
Superbike World Championship riders
Supersport World Championship riders
Sportspeople from Leicestershire